100 Days is a 1991 Indian Hindi-language psychological thriller film, starring Jackie Shroff, Madhuri Dixit, Moon Moon Sen and Javed Jaffrey. The film is a mystery thriller that follows the events in the life of a woman with Extrasensory perception. It was a remake of the Tamil film 1984 Nooravathu Naal, which itself was an unofficial adaptation of the 1977 Italian giallo film Sette note in nero (English Title: The Psychic or Seven Notes in Black) and American film Eyes of Laura Mars

Plot
The film opens with a young woman, Devi (Madhuri Dixit), who gets sudden visions (usually accompanied with a mild panic attack) of incidents and accidents that are yet to happen. Devi has a vision of her sister Rama (Moon Moon Sen) being murdered. Her college friends Sudha Mathur (Sabeeha) and Sunil (Javed Jaffrey) try to help her sort through her visions, but to little avail. Devi is relieved after she talks to her sister and finds that she is alive. However, just some time later, Rama is murdered in the same way as Devi had pictured. The murderer hides Rama's body in her mansion's wall. Rama is reported missing. Devi firmly believes Rama is dead. Five years later, Devi moves to her uncle (Ajit Vachani)'s home, where she eventually meets and is courted by millionaire businessman Ram Kumar (Jackie Shroff). Sunil, who was secretly in love with Devi, is deeply disappointed. Devi and Ram marry and enter his family mansion, which he has re-earned after a legal battle. Little known to anybody, this is the same mansion where Rama was buried. When Devi starts having the visions again, Rama's skeleton is not the only thing that will come tumbling out.

Devi sees a wall in the mansion and tears it down, only to find a skeleton tumbling out of it. Devi knows whose skeleton it is: as Rama had a necklace similar to Devi's. Also, the dead woman's skeleton is roughly same height as that of Rama. The Inspector (Shivaji Satam) quickly points out that since the mansion was closed when Rama disappeared, anyone could have hidden a dead body in there and nobody would know the truth. However, he doubts that the dead woman is Rama: several such necklaces are available.

Devi gets premonition of another woman getting murdered. She also pinpoints two details: a magazine named Priya with a horse on its cover and a video cassette labelled 100 Days. Sunil and Devi visit the weekly magazine office. The editor (Shashi Kiran) politely informs them that the next six months' covers do not feature any equestrian theme whatsoever. The video cassette clue, too, is a dead end: no video store in Bombay carries any such title as '100 days'. Devi begins delving into Rama's life. She learns that Rama was a research scholar and was working on a thesis about ancient sculptures and temples in India. A quick investigation by Devi during a visit to the Bombay Museum reveals that many artifacts listed by Rama either had mysteriously disappeared, got stolen or were replaced by fakes. She also learns that two people working in the museum, Security Officer Jagmohan (Jai Kalgutkar) and Record Keeper Parvati (Neelam Mehra), were fired on suspicion. Parvati is revealed to be the new victim of Devi's visions.

Jagmohan is a hot-headed man. Parvati knows Rama's killer and had videotaped the murder. She tries to blackmail the murderer, but the murderer tries to kill her. She sneaks into a video library, sticks a label '100 days' on the cassette and tries to escape. But Jagmohan succeeds in killing her, just as Devi had seen. Later, due to some last minute developments, the weekly magazine 'Priya' prints an issue with a horse on its cover. Devi soon realizes that Parvati has been murdered. She goes to the video library and retrieves the video cassette. Jagmohan tries to kill her, but her luck prevails and she escapes. She comes back into the mansion, where she gets a vision of herself in an injured state and a broken mirror in the mansion. She tells Ram about the developments and sits with him to watch the video cassette. Ram has no idea about the cassette's contents are.

However, as the video cassette is being played, Devi gets another shock: she sees her sister Rama confronting Ram. Based on the evidence in the video cassette, it becomes clear that Ram is the murderer. Devi tells him that she is pregnant with his child. Ram offers to explain. Ram tells that he was from an affluent family, but his father lost all his wealth due to gambling and eventually died. When Ram sought financial help from his relatives, they spurned his requests, leaving him helplessly alone. Consequently, he took to illegal ways of earning money. He ran into Jagmohan and Parvati. Later, the trio became partners and started smuggling the artifacts from museums and replaced them with fakes. Rama suspected it and decided to expose them. That night, Ram went to talk to Rama. But Jagmohan, who was also there, lost his temper and shot her dead. Parvati was secretly taping the incident, but due to her camera's angle, it looked as if Ram was the killer. Ram offers to surrender to police and phones them. He confesses his crime and asks them to come to his place.

No sooner has he stopped talking, when Jagmohan stabs him in his back. Ram loses consciousness, while Devi fights with Jagmohan. In this unequal fight, Devi is overpowered and rendered unconscious after being hit on her forehead by a conch hurled at her by Jagmohan. Then, Jagmohan buries her alive in the same wall where he had buried Rama. Just as he is about to escape, he sees Sunil coming in. Jagmohan hides while Sunil is surprised to see the mansion open with nobody in it. Just then, Devi's wrist watch alarm chimes. Sunil is surprised to hear the sound coming from behind the wall and puts two and two together. He starts removing the bricks of freshly constructed wall, when Jagmohan suddenly attacks him. However, Sunil puts up a good fight and is able to defeat him. Ram wakes up too and goes towards the wall to remove the bricks and manages to remove the unconscious Devi from the wall. Sunil soon overpowers Jagmohan and dumps him into the swimming pool.

The police arrive at the scene. Sunil is surprised to see Ram being arrested as well. Devi looks wearily as the police van leaves with Jagmohan and Ram in custody.

Cast
 Jackie Shroff as Ram Kumar
 Madhuri Dixit as Devi 
 Moon Moon Sen as Rama
 Javed Jaffrey as Sunil
 Laxmikant Berde as Balam
 Vijay Arora as Doctor
 Shivaji Satam as Police Inspector
 Ajit Vachani as Devi's Uncle
 Jai Kalgutkar as Jagmohan
 Neelam Mehra as Parvati
 Sabeeha as Sudha Mathur
 Mahavir Shah as Mr. Mathur

Soundtrack

Awards and nominations
 Laxmikant Berde was nominated for Filmfare Best Performance in comic role.

References

External links
 

Indian mystery thriller films
1990s psychological thriller films
1991 films
1990s mystery thriller films
1990s Hindi-language films
Films scored by Raamlaxman
Hindi remakes of Tamil films
Indian remakes of Italian films
Indian psychological thriller films
Films directed by Partho Ghosh
Hindi-language thriller films